Epopella plicata is a species of symmetrical sessile barnacle in the family Tetraclitidae. It is found in New Zealand.

References

Tetraclitidae
Crustaceans described in 1843